Newhall is a city in Benton County, Iowa, United States. The population was 876 at the time of the 2020 census. It is part of the Cedar Rapids Metropolitan Statistical Area.

History
Newhall was founded in 1881, following construction of the Chicago, Milwaukee and St. Paul Railroad through the territory.

Geography

Demographics

2010 census
As of the census of 2010, there were 875 people, 353 households, and 254 families living in the city. The racial makeup of the city was 98.3% White, 1.0% African American, 0.1% Native American, 0.3% Asian, and 0.2% from two or more races. Hispanic or Latino of any race were 1.0% of the population.

There were 353 households, of which 33.7% had children under the age of 18 living with them, 60.6% were married couples living together, 7.9% had a female householder with no husband present, 3.4% had a male householder with no wife present, and 28.0% were non-families. 25.5% of all households were made up of individuals, and 13.6% had someone living alone who was 65 years of age or older. The average household size was 2.48 and the average family size was 2.98.

The median age in the city was 39.7 years. 25.6% of residents were under the age of 18; 5.8% were between the ages of 18 and 24; 25.6% were from 25 to 44; 25.5% were from 45 to 64; and 17.5% were 65 years of age or older. The gender makeup of the city was 48.0% male and 52.0% female.

2000 census
As of the census of 2000, there were 886 people, 360 households, and 245 families living in the city. The racial makeup of the city was 100.00% White. Hispanic or Latino of any race were 0.68% of the population.

There were 360 households, out of which 33.9% had children under the age of 18 living with them, 61.1% were married couples living together, 4.4% had a female householder with no husband present, and 31.9% were non-families. 27.5% of all households were made up of individuals, and 17.5% had someone living alone who was 65 years of age or older. The average household size was 2.46 and the average family size was 3.02.

In the city, the population was spread out, with 27.2% under the age of 18, 6.9% from 18 to 24, 26.2% from 25 to 44, 18.7% from 45 to 64, and 21.0% who were 65 years of age or older. The median age was 39 years. For every 100 females, there were 88.9 males. For every 100 females age 18 and over, there were 88.0 males.

The median income for a household in the city was $43,269, and the median income for a family was $51,250. Males had a median income of $35,250 versus $29,167 for females. The per capita income for the city was $20,124. About 0.8% of families and 2.3% of the population were below the poverty line, including none of those under age 18 and 2.1% of those age 65 over.

Education
Benton Community School District operates local public schools.

References

Cities in Benton County, Iowa
Cities in Iowa
Cedar Rapids, Iowa metropolitan area
1881 establishments in Iowa